Víðidalstunga is a small village near Víðidal in the former parish of Þorkelshólshreppur, Vestur-Húnavatnssýsla, Iceland.

An ancient manor and noble family lived in the area was centuries since at least the early 14th century. Víðidalstungu Church was built in 1889 and contains an altar with paintings by the painter Ásgrímur Jónsson.

References

Populated places in Northwestern Region (Iceland)